Roy Chester "Beau" Bell (August 20, 1907 – September 14, 1977) was an American professional baseball outfielder. He played in Major League Baseball (MLB) from 1935 to 1941 for the St. Louis Browns, Detroit Tigers, and Cleveland Indians. Bell was named to the 1937 American League All-Star Team.

Bell finished 13th in voting for the 1936 American League MVP for playing in 155 games and having 616 at bats, 100 runs, 212 hits, 40 doubles, 12 triples, 11 home runs, 123 runs batted in, four stolen bases, 60 base on balls, a .344 batting average, .403 on-base percentage, .502 slugging percentage, 309 total bases and six sacrifice hits.

He finished 17th in voting for the 1937 AL MVP for leading the league in hits (218) and doubles (51) and playing in 156 games and having 642 at bats, 82 runs, eight triples, 14 home runs, 117 runs batted in, two stolen bases, 53 base on balls, a .340 batting average, .391 on-base percentage, .509 slugging percentage, 327 total bases and three sacrifice hits.  His 51 doubles remains an Orioles single season record.

In seven seasons Bell played in 767 games and had 2,718 at bats, 378 runs, 806 hits, 165 doubles, 32 triples, 46 home runs, 437 runs batted in, 11 stolen bases, 272 base on balls, a .297 batting average, .362 on-base percentage, .432 slugging percentage, 1,173 total bases and 26 sacrifice hits.

An alumnus of the University of Houston and Texas A&M University, he died in Bryan, Texas at the age of 70.

See also
 List of Major League Baseball annual doubles leaders

References

External links

 Baseball Almanac

1907 births
1977 deaths
St. Louis Browns players
Detroit Tigers players
Cleveland Indians players
American League All-Stars
Baseball players from Texas
People from Bellville, Texas
Major League Baseball right fielders
Texas A&M University alumni
Texas A&M Aggies baseball coaches
Austin Pioneers players